Moville Mysteries is a Canadian animated horror adventure television series starring Frankie Muniz as Mosley "Mo" Moville. Two seasons were produced with 26 episodes from September 7, 2002, to May 14, 2003. The show was on YTV in Canada and Fox Kids (later Jetix) in Latin America. In terms of digital distribution, the complete series has been made available for streaming on the Rogers Anyplace TV video on demand platform and Tubi TV.

Plot
The series revolves around Mosley "Mo" Moville, a high school student in Ouigee Falls, where the supernatural and strange happen almost every day. Mo loves the supernatural, and loves getting involved with solving the mysteries. Joining him are his friends Tommy "Hitch" Hitchcock and Mimi Valentine. Occasionally they are joined by local conspiracy theorist Billy "B.B." Boon. Occasionally the three don't have anything to do with the plot of the story, and instead Mo acts as the narrator.

Characters
Mosley "Mo" Moville (voiced by Frankie Muniz) is a rather short kid that loves the supernatural. He acts as both the main protagonist and narrator of the series.
Tommy "Hitch" Hitchcock (voiced by Dan Petronijevic) is Mo's best friend who speaks in stereotypical skater lingo and wears 3-D glasses all the time. Hitch isn't too bright and occasionally gets the team into trouble.
Mimi Valentine (voiced by Tara Spencer-Nairn) is the lone female of the group and the most level headed. She acts as the voice of reason and loves animals.
Billy "B.B." Boon (voiced by Cliff Saunders) is the local conspiracy theorist who always believes aliens are involved in some way. He occasionally is right, just not in the way people think.

Episodes

Season 1 (2002)

Season 2 (2003)

References

External links

2000s Canadian animated television series
2000s Canadian comic science fiction television series
2002 Canadian television series debuts
2003 Canadian television series endings
Canadian children's animated adventure television series
Canadian children's animated science fantasy television series
Canadian children's animated horror television series
Canadian children's animated mystery television series
Canadian children's animated comic science fiction television series
YTV (Canadian TV channel) original programming
Television series by Nelvana
Nickelodeon original programming
Television shows set in the United States